La Rumorosa is a town in the municipality of Tecate, Baja California, Mexico. It has a population of 1,836 inhabitants. It lies on the road between Mexicali and Tecate, and it is directly across the international border from Jacumba Hot Springs, California. However, no official border crossing exists; the nearest official crossing is in Tecate. The La Rumorosa area contains Native American cave paintings, which are the primary tourist draw.

Geographic location 
The town is located at 32º32'06" N by 116º03'00" W; and has an altitude of 1278 meters.

Demographics 
The 1980 census recorded a population of 531 inhabitants. In 1990, it rose to 1387 inhabitants, and, in 1995 there was a decrease to 1246 inhabitants. During the 2000 census, the population stood at 2,033 inhabitants. In 2005, INEGI registered a population of 1615 inhabitants.

Roadway 

La Rumorosa also refers to the famous road that crosses the Sierra de Juárez Mountains in Baja California, which is part of Mexican Federal Highway 2D. This was completed in 1917 under the governorship of Esteban Cantu. Before this road was constructed, land travel between Tijuana and the rest of Mexico required travel through the United States.

Initially, this road was a two-way street only somewhat dangerous due to the wind in the region and the steep grade of the road, as well as the recklessness of some drivers to try to finish this stretch of highway faster, causing numerous accidents. Currently there are two two-lane roads each, one upstream and the other downstream, with improved marking and consequently, a significant reduction of accidents.

However, even with security measures, the road is still considered one of the most dangerous for inexperienced drivers, so it is always advisable to observe a minimum safe distance, to not exceed the speed limit, and use engine braking whenever possible. Headlights are advised in adverse conditions.

El Vallecito artifacts 

In the town of La Rumorosa is the archaeological site "El Vallecito", a collection of native paintings that are a true portrait of the native American heritage of Baja California.

The sites also contain pottery scattered on guards and a lot of mortars. To date, in El Vallecito more than 18 sets of paintings have been identified, important ones are: the "Rooted Man" group, the "Indian Cave," "The Imp" group, the "Wittinñur" group and "The Shark".

Climate 
Owing to its relatively high altitude, La Rumorosa has a cool semi-arid climate (Köppen BSk), just above an arid climate (BWk). During the winter season can occur with prolonged cold periods of significant snowfall, with January being the month with the most snow. The area is subject to sporadic summer thunderstorms known as monsoons, whilst in winter snow storms occasionally affect the region. The area has strong winds, facilitating development of wind power.

See also 

 Baja California
 Mexicali
 Tecate

References 

Cities in Tecate Municipality